Lentini Caciano (born 15 August 2001) is a Curaçaoan footballer who plays as a midfielder for the Under-21 team of the Dutch club Emmen.

Career statistics

Club

Notes

References

2001 births
Living people
Curaçao footballers
Curaçao under-20 international footballers
Dutch footballers
Association football midfielders
PEC Zwolle players
FC Emmen players
Eredivisie players